The Qualifying Grand Prix of Poland was the first qualifying Gliding Grand Prix for the FAI World Grand Prix 2010-2011. Because the usage of handicaps is not allowed in the Grand Prix style of competitions, only the planes with handicap index 101 from Club class are allowed. This gliders are: ASW19, B; Cirrus CS 11-75 L; Cirrus G(w); Cirrus; Cirrus B(w);
DG 100; Hornet (w); Jantar std 2 i 3; Brawo; Ls 1f, 45; Std Libelle 17m; SZD 59.
Because very difficult weather conditions did allow only 2 races to be completed, the Qualifying Grand Prix of Poland 2010 has been canceled.

See also 
Poland Grand Prix Gliding 2009

External links 
 https://web.archive.org/web/20100529223816/http://www.fai.org/gliding/QSGP2010_2011

Gliding competitions
Gliding
2010 in air sports
2010 in Polish sport
Gliding in Poland
Aviation history of Poland